MAG was a massively multiplayer online first-person shooter video game developed by Zipper Interactive for the PlayStation 3. The game was released in North America on January 26, 2010, mainland Europe on January 27 and the United Kingdom on January 29. It was released in Australia and New Zealand on February 11, 2010. MAG received an award from Guinness World Records as "Most Players in a Console FPS" with 256 players.

On January 28, 2014, the online servers for MAG were shut down. Due to its reliance on online play, it is no longer possible to play the game.

Gameplay

MAG used a new server architecture to support online battles with up to 256 players, with users divided into eight-player squads, with four squads forming a platoon, and four platoons forming a company. Each squad is led by a player who has advanced through the game's ranking system. Character statistics and development also increase with frequent gameplay. The players assigned leadership positions are able to simultaneously direct the battle and participate directly in combat.

Version 2.0 introduced a new skill tree and also a supply depot for purchasing weapons. Now, in the skill tree there are individual classes in which players can spend their skill points. These classes include Assault, Marksman, Close Quarters, Special Ops, Medical, Engineering, Athleticism, Vehicles, and Resistances, which then branches off into their own skill tree. Players now in the supply depot have a balance which is money that is earned from every match. So instead of getting the weapons/attachments in the skill tree they can now be purchased separately. After an item is bought players have the choice of selling that item for half of its original price. 
Patch v1.05 introduced a modified leadership selection algorithm that relies on using leadership points that are earned by winning battles while being at least a squad leader and whether the player has a Bluetooth headset or not.

Basic battles take place within ongoing, faction-based campaigns to encourage the player to actively play. The game's E3 unveiling trailer featured large landscapes, tactics such as air strikes and parachuting, and a variety of vehicles, from tanks and armored personnel carriers (APCs) to airplanes.

Players were able to customize the face, voice, and armor of their characters, as well as what weapons and kit they carry into battle. In game, the player could level up to 70 on any faction. After achieving level 70, players could enter the Veteran mode and select a new faction (or, if a player chooses so, Veteran in the same faction as before). Veteran mode wipes out the current progress and makes the player start from scratch, although the medals, ribbons, statistics and the leadership points player has earned in the past remain intact. Player also receives a +10% XP bonus which increases the leveling speed. Veteran bonuses do not stack, which means that the +10% remains no matter how many times player has used this mode. Aside from that, player receives a star insignia under his current rank which is used so the experienced players are not confused with newcomers. The number of the stars indicate how many times the player has reached level 70.

Gameplay Modes
Gameplay consists of six separate modes (two of which—Interdiction and Escalation—are DLC) and an additional training mode.

Suppression
The smallest gameplay mode in terms of scale, was Suppression, which was the only mode that did not influence the Shadow War. Suppression was a team deathmatch mode that pits 32 players of one faction against 32 players of another. Provided they meet the qualification requirements, players can be assigned leadership positions in this game mode, although they have no leadership abilities. There are 4 Squad Leaders (SL) and 1 Platoon Leader (PL) per faction in this game type. Suppression makes use of modified maps from the Sabotage game mode.

Sabotage
Sabotage was the smallest mode of those with Shadow War influence. It was played by 64 players from two of the game's three factions, 32 players to a side. In Sabotage, the attacking team must work to secure two enemy satellite uplink centers—objectives A and B. Once both centers have been secured and simultaneously held, objective C is unlocked—the defending team's base. The attackers then need to plant an explosive charge at C and defend it until it explodes to win. As in Suppression, there are 4 SLs and 1 PL per faction in this game type. Again, they have no leadership abilities yet, but communication and organization is the leadership key to victory in this mode. The game runs on a 20-minute timer, countdown of which is paused while a charge is active at C. If the time expires before the attackers have destroyed C, the defenders win.

Acquisition
Acquisition pits one faction against another, 128 players per game, 64-player factions, and is MAG's variant on the Capture the Flag game type. The maps are split into two sides, facing one platoon (4 squads) from each faction against another, as the attacking team attempts to capture 2 of the defending team's "prototype" Escort Vehicles (APC). These vehicles are placed deep within the defending team's territory on each side of the map and a row of 4 bunkers, which the attackers can destroy, stand in the way. This is the first mode with Leadership Abilities. In addition to bunkers, the defenders have other assets which the attackers may destroy. They are: the Anti-Aircraft Artillery (AAA), Mortar Battery, Sensor Array, and Motor Pools. These, along with the bunkers, are optional destruction targets. The Mortar Battery allows Squad Leaders (SL) and Platoon Leaders (PL) to call in artillery strikes, such as mortar barrages and poison gas. Destruction of this asset takes away these abilities until the defenders repair the asset. The Sensor Array allows the PL to call in a sensor sweep, which reveals enemy locations on the mini-map—its destruction takes away that ability. The AAA serves two purposes: blocking the attacking team's SLs and PL abilities (aerial strikes and UAV recon) and prevents forward spawning. Destruction of the AAA allows the attackers to use their leadership abilities, and also to spawn into battle behind the defenders' bunker line either in an immovable helicopter or by parachuting. The Motor Pools give no leadership abilities, but they spawn APCs which the defenders can use to get to the front lines quicker and to defend funneling points with its turret. The attackers must make their way to the back of the map, open the Escort Vehicle's containers (by hacking a control panel), and drive the vehicle to their own container at the other end of the map. If the attackers get hold of an escort vehicle, the defenders must destroy it. In the vehicle's way stands roadblocks and a gate, which must be destroyed to drive the APC by. If the bunkers are not destroyed, the defenders way spawn in them making it easier for them to destroy the stolen APC on its way by. The bunkers also have a very dangerous turret, which can be destroyed independently of the bunker. Attackers win by capturing 2 vehicles; defenders win by preventing them to do so before the 20 minute timer expires.

Interdiction
The Interdiction is available via downloadable content (DLC). In this mode 128 players (64 vs. 64) must capture and hold three neutral bases. The longer a PMC holds a base, a bar for that PMC will fill up on the top of the screen. In addition each 8-man squad has an APC. The maps for the Interdiction mode are themed after the 3 PMCs but are neutral, meaning Valor could face Raven on the S.V.E.R. themed map and any other combination. The game is set on a 20-minute timer, and whoever fills their bar first, or whoever has their bar filled the most at the end, wins.

Domination
The largest game mode was Domination. It supported 256 players, 128 to a side in a single game. Maps were split into 4 sides that meet in the middle, facing one platoon (4 squads) of attackers against another of defenders on each side. The objective of the attackers was to unlock and hold the lettered objectives, A through H, two to a platoon, located at the center of the map where it crosses, to fill a damage bar before the game timer expires. In order to unlock their objectives, each attacking platoon must capture and simultaneously hold both of the defending platoon's burnoff towers. Once that is accomplished, the platoons must then hold both cooling towers, and then the objectives are unlocked. Between the burnoff towers and the cooling towers stands a row of 4 bunkers (one for each defending squad). Destruction of the bunkers changes that defending squad's spawn to the back spawn, behind the lettered objectives, in the middle of the map where the sides meet.

As in Acquisition, the defenders had assets which the attackers were able to destroy to take away their SL and PL abilities until they are repaired. These assets are located between the cooling towers and the lettered objectives. Taking down the AAA will again allow the attacking SLs and PLs to call in their abilities, and will unlock the forward spawns located between the defenders' bunkers and the cooling towers. In addition to Squad Leaders (16 per faction, per domination game) and Platoon Leaders (4 per faction), Domination introduces the Officer In Charge (OIC) leadership position. This is the highest ranking leadership position in the game, and each is assigned to lead his 128 players to Domination victory. OICs have very powerful abilities that can affect spawning rates of the defenders and replenish or block the abilities of SLs and PLs. These abilities are not affected by the AAA or assets, and they can be used at any time (provided the other OIC hasn't blocked his ability). Holding the lettered objectives until the damage bar is filled wins the game for the attackers; preventing them to do so by the time the 30 minute timer expires won the game for the defenders.

Multifiles
In addition there is an option entitled Multiqueue in which the player can be queued for multiple game modes that they choose. This mode gives a stackable +20% bonus for each game mode the player queues for, this does not however apply if the player only queues for one game mode.

Escalation
Escalation (DLC) is the first mode to feature all three PMCs fighting on the same map. Up to 96 players, 32 per PMC can play. The idea of Escalation is for one team to capture two of three letters on the map A, B, or C. When two of the letters are successfully obtained and defended, the letter "D" will be unlocked. At this point, the team which captured the two points will have to make their way to D and defend it. The other letters will become locked during this time. The other two PMCs will attempt to secure D. If one of the attackers obtains D the other letters will be opened again and all three PMCs will have to do the same thing again in order to unlock D. Every time D is unlocked by a certain team the bar will increase for that PMC. The team who fills the bar the most wins the game. No strikes can be called in by the platoon and squad leaders.

Development
MAG previously titled MAG: Massive Action Game. The game was announced at Sony's E3 2008 press conference. Various subtitles were being considered for the game, including MAG: Shadow War, MAG: Zero, MAG: Global Assault and MAG: Final Hour. The Massive Action Game subtitle was used in the Japanese release, but not elsewhere.

Beta testing
Private beta invitations were sent to members who applied for the beta in the first half of August. The beta was limited to run only during designated time slots. Aside from players, this phase of private beta included members from the press as well. Zipper Interactive revealed the official public beta would launch on September 17. Private beta testers were also invited to the Qore beta. Annual subscribers to Qore who subscribed before September 17 had a chance to get into the beta on September 17. The final version of the beta was v1.50. The beta ended on December 5. An open beta was made available on the PlayStation Store for download on January 4, 2010, and ended on January 10, 2010. A new open beta was downloadable from the PlayStation Store starting August 24, 2010.

Clan deploy
Version 2.0 included a new addition to MAG, clan deploy, which allows a clan to enter a queue as one group and the squads will be randomly assigned into the match.

Pre-order bonuses
Different distributors had pre-order bonuses for MAG. GameStop was offering an in-game bonus for the S.V.E.R. team. Hollywood Video and GameCrazy offered an in-game bonus for the Raven team. Best Buy was offering an in game bonus for the Valor team. 7-Eleven included a "recruitment kit" that includes background information on the "Shadow War" and PMC skill sets. Amazon had an exclusive S.V.E.R.-based personal space in PlayStation Home. All of the pre-order skins were available for free on PlayStation Network in North America.

Collector's Edition
The limited edition of MAG, which was only available in Europe through pre-order, comes in a SteelBook packaging, and includes extra features such as brand new combat armor (for use in game) - choose from three distinctive uniform designs: Bulldog, Spyder or Hazard, and three dynamic themes for the PS3 system. The uniform designs, however, were made free to download in the PlayStation Store.

Social networking
www.jointheshadowwar.com was a custom-built site that used Facebook Connect as a central component to building a community of MAG users on Facebook. The site was presented as an underground recruiting company called Private Recruiting Operation (PRO) that could help "free agents" (military people that were put out of a job as a result of the game's fictional future). The site allowed visitors to "Enlist" and log in using their Facebook account to do so. However, the site has since been shut down.

Downloadable content
Zipper Interactive released their first DLC pack for free on the PlayStation Network on March 25. The DLC featured a new kind of grenade, skins, and special editions of the light machine guns. Zipper released the second DLC pack on April 19 with new sniper rifles and a new armor type.

Zipper Interactive released a new DLC pack called MAG Interdiction Mission Pack, which is the first DLC pack that was released. The pack featured a new 128-player game type called Interdiction. The DLC included three maps and also featured improved heavy armor and enhanced vehicle combat, new unlockable trophies, and new ribbons. The fourth DLC entitled Escalation was released to tie in with the release of the 2.0 beta version of MAG.

"Escalation" was the second add-on that was released. This DLC was released with three faction-themed neutral maps to play on. New trophies, ribbons, and guns were included in the pack.

Zipper Interactive and Sony released a MAG demo for download on the PlayStation Store at no charge. "The MAG trial gives you full access to all of MAG's maps, weapons, character skills and modes, with the only limit being a character growth cap at level 8." The demo was released to the North American store on March 29, 2011.

All of MAG's downloadable content is no longer available.

Story

Background
The game begins in 2025. As time passes, maintaining a full-scale military becomes a burden. In a globalized world, the only security threat is from small scale rogue organizations against whom large conventional forces are useless, and the fuel needed to supply increasingly mechanized armies becomes more costly.

As a result, most nations' armies decrease to the size necessary to defend against a "national emergency." Furthermore, under the "Millennium Accord", no nation's military is permitted to leave its own borders, officially creating world peace. In their place rise Private Military Corporations. They have two advantages: first, they compete, lowering their cost, and second, they are allowed to work for anyone, anywhere.

In an unregulated global economy, the companies soon compete by less than honest means. After enough mergers, bargains, and buy-outs, however, the remaining PMCs decide to put their weapons to full use. The original attacks follow a simple plan: neutralize a competitor's soldiers, lowering supply to cause them to charge more and, ultimately, go out of business.

The Shadow War, as it is called, grows in secret until the conflict moves into full swing, with the PMCs securing their own interests and violently fighting for contracts.

Factions
The game contains three different PMCs:

Raven Industries GmbH, a faction based in Vienna, Austria, with personnel from Italy, France, Germany, and other western European nations. Raven believes that precision in training creates perfection on the battlefield. Raven's operatives are high-tech, elite soldiers exposed to the latest virtual training techniques.
S.V.E.R. (Seryi Volk Executive Response), a guerrilla-style militant force based in Grozny, in the Chechen Republic in Russia. Their personnel are drawn from China, India and Russia, as well as some African and Middle Eastern nations. They're infamous for their passion of battle, and makeshift tactics.
Valor Company Inc., made up of U.S., British, Canadian and Latin American special forces, has elite, experienced soldiers, tough weaponry, and reliable vehicles. Valor's tech is based on the modern American military. Valor is based in Alaska and North-Western Canada.

Soundtrack
There are three different soundtracks, one for each faction. The soundtrack for S.V.E.R. was composed by Perttu Kivilaakso and Mikko Sirén from the Finnish cello metal band, Apocalyptica. The soundtrack for Valor was composed by Tree Adams. The soundtrack for Raven was composed by Sascha Dikiciyan aka Sonic Mayhem.

Reception

MAG has received generally positive reviews. According to Metacritic, the game stands at a 76. GameTrailers gave the game praise for its large multiplayer and inventive level-up system, giving the game an 8.2/10. G4 gave it 4 out of 5 stars saying it is a good addition to the PlayStation 3's library. IGN US gave the game a rating of 7.0/10, complaining about bugs, stiff animations, unbalanced factions and overall lack of content and polish for the price. IGN UK gave it 7.6/10 and complained about the same problems. GameSpot gave it a rating of 8/10, praising the well-integrated command structure, but complaining about technical awkwardness.

References

2010 video games
Cooperative video games
First-person shooters
Massively multiplayer online first-person shooter games
PlayStation 3-only games
PlayStation 3 games
PlayStation Move-compatible games
PlayStation Network games
Sony Interactive Entertainment games
Video games developed in the United States
Video games set in Alaska
Video games set in Panama
Video games set in Kyrgyzstan
Video games set in the 2020s
Video games set in 2025
Zipper Interactive games